Peter Alexander Haber (born 12 December 1952) is a Swedish actor. His father was German, his mother Swedish. He grew up in Skåne, Sweden,  and in Remscheid, Germany. In 1987 he was hired by the Stockholm City Theatre where he was active until 1994. At the 29th Guldbagge Awards, he was nominated for the Best Actor award for his role in Sune's Summer.

The most famous roles that Haber has played are the father Rudolf in the series Sune, Carl Hamilton in Fiendens fiende (Enemy's Enemy) and Martin Beck from 1997–2021 in the eponymous film series. He is also known for his role in the 2009 film The Girl with the Dragon Tattoo. Haber is in a relationship with actress Lena T. Hansson.

Partial filmography

1987: Nionde kompaniet - Lundkvist
1988: Venus 90 - Photographer
1989: 1939 - Police Assistant Wiren
1990-1991: My Enemy's Enemy (TV Mini-Series) - Hamilton
1991: Harry Lund' lägger näsan i blöt! - Rune 'Ebba' Ek
1991: Freud's Leaving Home - Man at the airplane
1991: Sunes jul (TV Series) - Rudolf Andersson
1992: Jönssonligan och den svarta diamanten (The Johnson-gang and the black diamond) - Doktorn
1993: Sune's Summer - Rudolf Andersson
1995: White Lies - Palle Hagmann
1995: Jönssonligans största kupp (The Johnson-gang's greatest robbery) - Doktorn
1996: Vinterviken - Frank, Elisabeth's father
1996: Juloratoriet - Aron Nordensson
1997: Slutspel - Nalle
1997-2021: Beck (TV Series) - Martin Beck
1999: Vägen ut (The Way Out) - Jakobsson
1999: Tomten är far till alla barnen (In Bed with Santa) - Janne
2000: Hur som helst är han jävligt död - Rolf
2000: Gossip - Gregor Becklén
2001: En förälskelse - Simon
2002: Shrek (Swedish) - Lord Farquaad (voice)
2004: Hotet (The Threat) - Rosin
2006: Små mirakel och stora - Per
2006: Göta kanal 2 – Kanalkampen - Grävmaskinist
2009: Män som hatar kvinnor (Men Who Hate Women) - Martin Vanger
2009: Crashpoint - 90 Minuten bis zum Absturz (Germany, TV Movie) - Michael Winkler
2011-2012: Gustafsson 3 tr (TV Series) - Roger
2014: Bamse and the Thief City - Bamse (voice)
2014: A Second Chance - Gustav
2016: Bamse and the Witch's Daughter - Bamse (voice)
2018: Halvdan Viking - Björn
2018: Bamse och dunderklockan - Bamse (voice)
2019: Britt-Marie var här - Kent

References

External links

Living people
1952 births
Swedish people of German descent
Male actors from Stockholm